= Abdullah Ateq =

Saudi Arabian actor

- Born: الممثل عبدالله عتيق; 4 May 1990 (age 36); Saudi Arabia
- Occupation: Actor
- Years active: 2011–present

Abdullah Ateq is a Saudi Arabian actor born in 1990. He started his work in the media field as a presenter and move on to an acting career in 2011. He is known for his various roles in the TV series No Big Deal (Arabic: أي خدمة).

== Awards ==
Abdullah Ateq was awarded by Rotana khalijia in 2015 for diverse roles in acting.
